Dhaka Rangers Football Club commonly known as Dhaka Rangers FC is a Bangladeshi Women's association football club from Dhaka. They participate in Bangladesh Women's Football League, the women's premier football league in Bangladesh. The club established in 2022 ahead of 2021–22 Bangladesh Women's Football League that is playing from November 2022.

History
The Dhaka Rangers FC was founded in August 2022. The club competes in the  2021–22 Bangladesh Women's Football League. They have played their first official game on 16 November 2022 at Dhaka versus Cumilla United which ended with drew 0–0 goal.

Current squad
The following squad was announced for BWFL 2021–22 season.

Competitive record

Head coach records

Club management

Current technical staff
As of October 2022

References

2022 establishments in Bangladesh
Dhaka
Association football clubs established in 2022
Women's football clubs in Bangladesh